is considered to be the oldest public park in Japan, having been founded in 1801 by Matsudaira Sadanobu, the 12th daimyō of Shirakawa Domain.  It was designated as both a National Historic Site of Japan and as a National Place of Scenic Beauty in 1934.

Overview
 was a Japanese daimyō of the mid-Edo period, famous for his financial reforms which saved the Shirakawa Domain, and the similar reforms he undertook during his tenure as chief  of the Tokugawa shogunate, from 1787 to 1793. He was also noted as a strong follower of the teaching of the Neo-Confucianism of Zhu Xi.

In 1801 Matsudaira Sadanobu built an embankment in a wetland to create a reservoir, around which he planted a garden on a vast scale. The perimeter of the walking path around the lake is over two kilometers. He elected 17 scenic spots around the lake and erected a monument engraved with Classical Chinese poems and Japanese waka poems. Most unusually, he opened the park to common people, regardless of their social status. He also built a tea room called "Kyorakutei" which could be enjoyed by the common people. He named the reservoir "South Lake" after the poem by the Tang Dynasty poet Li Bai  about Dongting Lake in Hunan Province, and also because the lake was located south of Komine Castle.

See also
List of Historic Sites of Japan (Fukushima)
List of Places of Scenic Beauty of Japan (Fukushima)

Notes

External links

Shirakawa city official home page
Shirakawa Tourist Information home page

Gardens in Japan
Gardens in Fukushima Prefecture
Shirakawa, Fukushima
Places of Scenic Beauty
Historic Sites of Japan